Elias John Kwandikwa (1 July 1966 – 2 August 2021) was a Tanzanian CCM politician and Member of Parliament for the Ushetu constituency since 2015. He was a Deputy Minister of Works, Transport and Communications, until 9 October 2017.
He then served as a Minister of Defence and National Service from December 2020 until his death in August 2021.

Background and education
He was born on 1 July 1966, in the Shinyanga Region of Tanzania. He attended Kisuke Primary School, from 1977 until 1983. He then transferred to Mwenge Secondary School for his middle school studies from 1984 until 1987. For his high school education, he studied at Shinyanga Secondary School, from 1988 until 1990.

He studied at The Institute of Finance Management from 1997 until 1999, graduating with an Advanced Diploma in Accountancy. In 2004, the National Board of Accountants and Auditors (NBAA), awarded him a certificate as a Certified Public Accountant (CPA). He then obtained a Master of Business Administration, from the Eastern and Southern African Management Institute (EASAMI), in 2015.

Work experience
His entire professional career has been spent in the Office of the Controller and Auditor General. He began as a Clerk Examiner Grade II, back in 1990, serving in that capacity until 1995. He was promoted to Clerk Examiner Grade I in 1995, serving in that capacity until 1997. From 1997 until 1999, he served as an Accounts Examiner Grade III.

From 1999 until 2000, he was the Assistant Resident Auditor for the Pwani Region. He took some time off to study for his CPA examinations. When he returned in 2005, he was appointed the Assistant Resident Auditor for the Tanzania Revenue Authority, serving in that capacity for less than one year. Later in 2005, he was appointed Chief Accountant in the Office of the Controller and Auditor General, serving there until 2015.

Political career
Elias Kwandikwa was an active member of the ruling Chama Cha Mapinduzi, starting back in 1991, when he served as a member of the party's central committee. He has held several positions in the Youth Wing of the party, at local, regional and national levels over the years. In 2015, he contested the parliamentary seat for Ushetu constituency on the CCM political party ticket. He won and was the incumbent. On 9 October 2017, he was sworn in by president John Magufuli, as the Deputy Minister of Works, Transport and Communication. In 2020, in Magufuli's second cabinet, Kwandikwa was given the keys to the Ministry of Defense and National Service after Hussein Mwinyi was elected President of Zanzibar. He served in this position until his death.

Death
Elias Kwandikwa died at Muhimbili National Hospital in Dar es Salaam on 2 August 2021, at the age of 55.

See also
Cabinet of Tanzania
Parliament of Tanzania

References

External links
Website of the Parliament of Tanzania

1966 births
2021 deaths
Chama Cha Mapinduzi MPs
Tanzanian MPs 2015–2020
Tanzanian MPs 2020–2025
Tanzanian politicians
Eastern and Southern African Management Institute alumni
Deputy government ministers of Tanzania
Tanzanian accountants
People from Shinyanga Region